Hinatara is a genus of insects belonging to the family Tenthredinidae.

Species:
 Hinatara excisa
 Hinatara nigripes
 Hinatara recta

References

Tenthredinidae
Hymenoptera genera